Redeye chub (Notropis harperi) is a species of cyprinid fish native to freshwaters of southeastern North America.

References 

 Robert Jay Goldstein, Rodney W. Harper, Richard Edwards: American Aquarium Fishes. Texas A&M University Press 2000, p. 101
 

Notropis
Fish described in 1941